Vatva railway station is a railway station under Western Railway zone in Gujarat state, India. Its code is Vatva. Vatva also has Diesel Loco Shed in Vatva. Passenger and MEMU trains halt here.

Location 

This railway station is located in the Vatva, an industrial area of Ahmedabad district.

Nearby stations 

 is nearest railway station towards , whereas  is nearest railway station towards .

References 

Railway stations in Ahmedabad district
Ahmedabad railway division